Compulsory sterilisation in Sweden were sterilisations which were carried out in Sweden, without a valid consent of the subject, during the years 1906–1975 on eugenic, medical and social grounds. Between 1972 and 2013, sterilisation was also a condition for gender reassignment surgery.

Legal grounds 
In 1922 the State Institute of Racial Biology was founded in Uppsala. In the 1930s, a law was passed that allowed mass sterilisation. The stated rationale behind the legislation was to prevent sterilisation from becoming a contraceptive method in the hands of the individual.

Another law, passed in 1941, was more far reaching and stated three broad grounds on which sterilisation could be carried out:

 Medical, if a pregnancy could pose a risk to life or good health of a woman suffering from chronic illness or permanently weakened constitution.
 Eugenic, which allowed sterilising people considered insane or with severe illness or with a physical disability, so that these traits are not passed on the offspring.
 Social, which allowed sterilising people deemed unsuitable to foster a child due to mental illness, being feebleminded or having an antisocial lifestyle.

The law did not foresee any age of consent limit. However, it was never legal to physically restrain a person.

Statistics 

The number of eugenic sterilisations peaked in the 1940s; from 1946, the number of sterilisations under the 1941 legal provisions gradually decreased.

In 1997, on behalf of the Swedish government, the ethnologists Mikael Eivergård and Lars-Eric Jönsson made an attempt at estimating what percentage of sterilisations were coerced. They found that a quarter of the applications were made under circumstances similar to coercion such as a condition for release from an institution and that another 9 percent were signed under pressure. In half of the cases they found no sign of coercion or pressure, but signs of the applicants' own initiative. Tydén uses these percentages to make an estimate of the number of operations under coercion. He found that 15,000 were made as a condition for release and that another 5500 to 6000 were made under other kinds of pressure, whereas 30,000 were voluntary and on the applicants' own initiative.

According to a 2000 government report, 21,000 people were estimated to have been forcibly sterilised, 6,000 were coerced into a "voluntary" sterilisation while the nature of a further 4,000 cases could not be determined.

From the 2000s, the Swedish state paid out damages to victims who filed for compensation.

Sterilisation during sex change 

Until 2012, sterilisation was mandatory before sex change. This last mandatory sterilisation has been criticised by several political parties in Sweden and since 2011 the Parliament of Sweden was expected to change the law but ran into opposition from the Christian Democrat party. After efforts to overturn the law failed in parliament, the Stockholm Administrative Court of Appeal overturned the law on 19 December 2012, declaring it unconstitutional after the law was challenged by an unidentified plaintiff.

See also 
 Reproductive rights
 History of eugenics

References 

Political history of Sweden
Sweden
Eugenics
Reproductive rights
Sterilization (medicine)
1934 establishments in Sweden
2012 disestablishments in Sweden
Disability in Sweden
Sweden
Human rights abuses in Sweden